Koshi Dam  is an earthfill dam located in Hokkaido Prefecture in Japan. The dam is used for irrigation. The catchment area of the dam is 10.4 km2. The dam impounds about 26  ha of land when full and can store 1316 thousand cubic meters of water. The construction of the dam was started on 1934 and completed in 1937.

References

Dams in Hokkaido